The Anysberg Nature Reserve of 62,500 ha, is situated in the western Little Karoo region of the Gouritz Cluster Biosphere Reserve in the Western Cape province, South Africa. The central mountain is named after Anise, Pimpinella anisum, which is found in the reserve. The reserve was established in 1984, to conserve succulent and fynbos flora in the Cape Fold Belt, and to reintroduce game which formerly occurred here.

The nearest towns are Laingsburg and Ladismith, which are both about 55 km from the main reserve entrance.

History 
Land for the reserve was first set aside in 1984 below the Anysberg Mountain Catchment Area (designated in 1978).

Biodiversity 
Fed by three rivers, the diversity of life is supported here amidst mountain feathers and the characteristic Klein Karoo veil. 

About 180 species of birds are regularly spotted in the reserve, making it a popular choice for bird watchers. In addition to the enchanting landscape and rich plant and animal life, the reserve is also home to San rock art, painted thousands of years ago.

Gallery

References

External reference
 Official website

Nature reserves in South Africa
Provincial nature reserves of the Western Cape
Protected areas established in 1988